CCGS Wilfred Templeman was a Canadian Coast Guard fisheries research vessel that entered service 1981 with the Department of Fisheries and Oceans. In 1995 the Fisheries and Oceans and Canadian Coast Guard fleets were amalgamated and Wilfred Templeman joined the Canadian Coast Guard. The research vessel patrolled the coast off Newfoundland and Labrador. In 2011, the vessel was taken out of service, sold to commercial interests and renamed Blain M.

Design and description
The ship is powered by a diesel engine driving one controllable pitch propeller creating .

Service history
Constructed in 1981 by Ferguson Industries Ltd at their yard in Pictou, Nova Scotia with the yard number 210, the ship entered service with the Department of Fisheries and Oceans in March 1982. The vessel was named for Wilfred Templeman, a marine biologist from Newfoundland and Labrador who was director of the Fisheries Research Board' biological station at St. John's. In 1995, in an effort to combine tasks, administration and making savings in both ships and funds, the Fisheries and Oceans and Canadian Coast Guard fleets were merged under the command of the Canadian Coast Guard. Wilfred Templeman was given the new prefix CCGS as a result. The ship was registered in Ottawa, Ontario but homeported at St. John's. During the Turbot War, Wilfred Templeman escorted the Spanish fishing trawler Estai to St. John's after the Spanish ship was detained for illegal fishing on the Grand Banks of Newfoundland. 

In 2008, Wilfred Templeman was taken out of service by the Canadian Coast Guard. The research vessel was considered too old to be of much more use. In September 2009 the Department of Fisheries and Oceans announced invitations for contracts to replace several of the Coast Guard research vessels, including Wilfred Templeman.

In July 2011, Wilfred Templeman was advertised for sale, and was eventually sold for $371,956.55 to McKeil Work Boats of Hamilton, Ontario. The ship was re-registered under the name Blain M in March 2012.

References

Notes

Citations

Sources
 
 
 
 

Alfred Needler-class fisheries research ships
1980 ships
Ships built in Nova Scotia
Ships of the Canadian Coast Guard